Yashwant Singh was MLA for 10 years and then MLC. 
Former member of the Samajwadi Party in Uttar Pradesh.
On 10 June 2016, he was re-elected to the Uttar Pradesh Legislative Council.
He is also the president of Chandrasekhar trust at Darul safa Lucknow on the honour of former prime minister Chandrasekhar.
He has a great political influence in Uttar Pradesh.

On 6 May 2018, he again became a member of the Uttar Pradesh Legislative Council. He had vacated his seat for Yogi Adityanath for him to continue as Chief Minister of Uttar Pradesh and had resigned from the Samajwadi Party.

References

Living people
Samajwadi Party politicians
Members of the Uttar Pradesh Legislative Council
Year of birth missing (living people)
Bharatiya Janata Party politicians from Uttar Pradesh
Samajwadi Party politicians from Uttar Pradesh